Jonatan Berggren (born 16 July 2000) is a Swedish professional ice hockey forward who is currently playing for the  Detroit Red Wings of the National Hockey League (NHL). Berggren was selected in the second round, 33rd overall, of the 2018 NHL Entry Draft by the Red Wings.

Playing career
Berggren made his Swedish Hockey League debut playing with Skellefteå AIK during the 2017–18 SHL season. Berggren was sidelined for most of the 2018–19 season with a back injury.

In his fourth season with Skellefteå AIK, Berggren broke out offensively in the 2020–21 campaign, finishing sixth in SHL scoring with 45 points in 49 games and co-leading Skellefteå AIK. Berggren became only the 13th player in SHL history to compile over 40 points in a season at age 20 or younger, and the first since Elias Pettersson in 2018.

On 21 May 2021, Berggren was signed by the Detroit Red Wings to a three-year, entry-level contract.

Career statistics

Regular season and playoffs

International

References

External links

2000 births
Detroit Red Wings draft picks
Detroit Red Wings players
Grand Rapids Griffins players
Living people
Skellefteå AIK players
Sportspeople from Uppsala
Swedish ice hockey right wingers